The 2012 Texas Longhorns football team (variously "Texas," "UT," the "Longhorns," or the "'Horns") represented the University of Texas at Austin in the 2012 NCAA Division I FBS football season. The Longhorns were led by 15th-year head coach Mack Brown and played their home games at Darrell K Royal–Texas Memorial Stadium. They were a member of the Big 12 Conference. They finished the season 9–4, 5–4 in Big 12 play to finish in a tie for third place. They were invited to the Alamo Bowl where they defeated Oregon State.

The team's motto for the season was created by Longhorns players. The motto was R.I.S.E., which stood for words Relentless, Intensity, Sacrifice/Swagger, and Emotion.

Previous season
After the 2010 Texas Longhorns football team finished with the first losing season since 1997,  Texas began the 2011 NCAA Division I FBS football season unranked in the preseason Associated Press poll for the first time since 1998, although they ranked 24th in the preseason Coaches' Poll. Texas defeated its first four opponents, including two that they had previously lost to in 2010. Texas would go on a two-game losing skid against top 10 teams Oklahoma and Oklahoma State before winning against Kansas and Texas Tech. The game against Kansas was the first shutout for a Texas football team since beating Baylor 63-0 in 2005. Texas would once again enter a two-game losing skid before beating Texas A&M in the Lone Star Showdown. The Longhorns would lose to Baylor before becoming selected to play in the 2011 Holiday Bowl. Texas would go on to win 21-10 against California, finishing the season with an 8-5 record.

Spring game

The annual Texas Orange–White spring game took place on April 1, 2012. However, the teams were named Horns and Texas. Quarterbacks David Ash, Case McCoy, and newly recruited Connor Brewer attempted passes during the game.

The Texas team won the coin toss and elected to receive the kickoff at the beginning of the game. They would eventually score first on a 60–yard run by wide receiver D.J. Monroe. The Texas team would hold the Horns scoreless after scoring two more touchdowns in the first and second quarters. However, the Horns recorded their first touchdown with 5:55 left in the second quarter. The Texas team would answer on special teams after Mykkele Thompson made a touchdown on a 99–yard kickoff return.

After halftime, both Texas and the Horns would each score touchdowns, although Texas would maintain a lead. The final score of the game was on a 1–yard run by Heath Hohmann late in the fourth quarter for the Horns. However, the Horns could not score again, and the Texas team won 35–28.

2012 NFL Draft
Three Texas players were drafted in the 2012 NFL Draft. All players drafted were players on the Texas defense.

Following the draft five 2011 Texas players were signed as undrafted free agents.

Roster

Recruiting class
During the 2011 recruiting period, Texas recruited 18 players, including nine from the 'ESPN 150.' As a result, Texas' recruiting class was ranked third by ESPN, second by Rivals and first by Scout.

Schedule
In 2012, Texas played six home games and five away games, as well as one game played on a neutral site. Texas began their 2012 season against two teams from the Mountain West Conference, Wyoming and New Mexico. Texas then faced Ole Miss, the first time Texas faced a team from the Southeastern Conference (SEC) since the 2010 BCS National Championship Game against Alabama and the first time they faced an SEC team in the regular season since 2008. After Texas' non–conference schedule, the Longhorns entered a bye week before playing a round-robin schedule against teams from the Big 12. Another bye week occurred before the game against TCU. Three football games during the season were broadcast exclusively on the Longhorn Network. , eight games were broadcast nationally, and only one, against Kansas, was broadcast regionally.

Denotes the largest crowd to watch a football game at Darrell K. Royal–Texas Memorial Stadium, set earlier in 2011 in the opening game against Rice, where an attendance of 101,624 was recorded. The record would be topped on September 4, 2016 with a crowd of 102,315 vs. Notre Dame.
Denotes the largest crowd to watch a football game at Jones AT&T Stadium, set earlier in 2012 against Oklahoma, where an attendance of 60,800 was recorded.

Game summaries

Wyoming

    
    
    
    
    
    
    
    
    

Leading up to the game Texas was favored to win by 31.5 points.

New Mexico

Ole Miss

Oklahoma State

West Virginia

Before the game, Texas was favored to win by 6.5 points over West Virginia. It was the first game against a top–10 opponent in either the AP Poll or Coaches' Poll since losing to Oklahoma State in 2011. Leading up to the game both teams were undefeated with 4–0 records, and this game was West Virginia's first road game as a Big 12 member. It was announced that kicker Anthony Fera, who had transferred to Texas before the season, would be playing after being sidelined during the start of the season because of a groin injury.  Darrell K. Royal–Texas Memorial Stadium saw a record attendance of 101,851, eclipsing the record set by a game against Rice in 2011.

Former Texas quarterback Vince Young, who attended the game, was the honorary team captain. Marquise Goodwin, Carrington Byndom, and D.J. Monroe were team captains for the offense, defense, and special teams, respectively.

At the start of the game Texas won the coin toss, but elected to defer, selecting to kickoff at the start of the game. The kickoff by kicker Nick Rose was returned 44 yards by Tavon Austin to start the game. On their opening drive, West Virginia drove down the field to score the first touchdown of the game on an eight-yard pass from leading Heisman Trophy candidate quarterback Geno Smith to wide receiver Stedman Bailey. Texas responded on a two-yard rushing touchdown by Joe Bergeron, tying the game at 7–7. After the scores both teams were held scoreless on their subsequent drives. A 42–yard field goal by West Virginia kicker Tyler Bitancurt was blocked by Alex Okafor, and Texas failed to convert on fourth down on the following drive, resulting in a turnover on downs. West Virginia scored again after Geno Smith threw a 40–yard touchdown pass, this time to Tavon Austin, to let the Mountaineers lead 14–7 to end the first quarter. West Virginia scored once again to open the second quarter, this time on a rushing touchdown, to extend the Mountaineer lead to 21–7. After Marquise Goodwin lost a fumble, Texas cornerback Carrington Byndom was able to block a subsequent punt by West Virginia. Texas was able to capitalize on the blocked punt to score a touchdown and close the lead to 21–14. On the following drive, Mountaineer quarterback Geno Smith fumbled near the goal line, which was recovered by Jackson Jeffcoat and leading to a defensive touchdown, tying the game once again at 21–21. To close out the first half of play West Virginia was able to score two field goals, but the Longhorns were able to score a touchdown. Texas led at halftime 28–27.

Anthony Fera scored his first field goal under the Texas Longhorns football team at the end of a drive to begin the first quarter. However, on the subsequent drive West Virginia scored another touchdown, once again on a catch by Stedman Bailey, to reclaim the lead 34–31. Following the receiving touchdown Texas was able to respond with a four-yard touchdown run by Joe Bergeron, his fourth rushing touchdown of the game. Geno Smith connected with Stedman Bailey again for another touchdown catch, this time for six yards to give West Virginia the lead once again at 41–38 to start the fourth quarter. On the next drive the Longhorns were unable to score a touchdown. On the next drive Geno Smith lost his second fumble of the game, allowing Texas to start with good field position. However, a bad snap by center Dominique Espinosa forced Texas back further from the goal line. On the following attempted field goal, Anthony Fera missed wide–right. West Virginia took the opportunity to extend their lead with a 5–yard touchdown by Andrew Buie to lead 48–38. With just over a minute in the game, Texas was able to score with 15 seconds remaining on an eight-yard pass from David Ash to Marquise Goodwin to make the score 48–45. Texas was unable to recover the ensuing onside kick, allowing West Virginia to run out the clock and win the game.

Texas runningback Joe Bergeron recorded a career-high four rushing touchdowns, which accounted for four out of five offensive touchdowns by Texas. It was the first time at least four rushing touchdowns were scored by a Longhorns player since Vince Young did so in the 2005 Rose Bowl. After the loss, Texas moved down to 15th in both the Associated Press Poll and Coaches' Poll.

Oklahoma

Baylor

Kansas

Texas Tech

Iowa State

TCU

Kansas State

Oregon State

Rankings

References

Texas
Texas Longhorns football seasons
Alamo Bowl champion seasons
Texas Longhorns football